Pseudocheiridae is a family of arboreal marsupials containing 17 extant species of ringtailed possums and close relatives. They are found in forested areas and shrublands throughout Australia and New Guinea.

Characteristics

Physically, they appear very similar to the pygmy possums, except for their greater size. Even so, they are relatively small animals, with the largest being cat-sized, and they weigh between 200 grams and 2 kilograms. They have grasping hands and feet with opposable first toes on their hindfeet, and, in all species save the greater glider, a prehensile tail. They are nocturnal, with large eyes.

All species feed almost entirely on leaves. To enable them to digest this tough and fibrous food, they have an enlarged cecum containing fermenting bacteria, and, like rabbits, they are coprophagous, passing food through their digestive tracts twice. Their teeth include a battery of grinding molars, and they lack lower canines. Their dental formula is:

Most are solitary animals, although a few live in small family groups, and they are generally shy and secretive, making them difficult to study. They travel across home ranges of up to 3 hectares (7.5 acres). Gestation lasts up to 50 days, but varies depending on species.

Classification
The listing for extant species is based on The Third edition of Wilson & Reeder's Mammal Species of the World (2005), except where the Mammal Diversity Database and IUCN agree on a change. The 18 living species of pseudocheirid possum are grouped into three subfamilies and six genera.
 †Pildra
 †Paljara
 †Marlu
 †Pseudokoala
 Subfamily Hemibelideinae
 Genus Hemibelideus
 Lemur-like ringtail possum, Hemibelideus lemuroides
 Genus Petauroides
 Southern greater glider, Petauroides volans
 Subfamily Pseudocheirinae
 Genus Petropseudes
 Rock-haunting ringtail possum, Petropseudes dahli
 Genus Pseudocheirus
 Common ringtail possum, Pseudocheirus peregrinus 
 Western ringtail possum, Pseudocheirus occidentalis 
 Genus Pseudochirulus
 Lowland ringtail possum, Pseudochirulus canescens
 Weyland ringtail possum, Pseudochirulus caroli
 Cinereus ringtail possum, Pseudochirulus cinereus
 Painted ringtail possum, Pseudochirulus forbesi
 Herbert River ringtail possum, Pseudochirulus herbertensis
 Masked ringtail possum, Pseudochirulus larvatus
 Pygmy ringtail possum, Pseudochirulus mayeri
 Vogelkop ringtail possum, Pseudochirulus schlegeli
 Subfamily Pseudochiropsinae
 Genus Pseudochirops
 D'Albertis' ringtail possum, Pseudochirops albertisii
 Green ringtail possum, Pseudochirops archeri
 Plush-coated ringtail possum, Pseudochirops corinnae
 Reclusive ringtail possum, Pseudochirops coronatus
 Coppery ringtail possum, Pseudochirops cupreus
 †Pseudochirops winteri

References

Possums
Extant Chattian first appearances
Taxa named by Herluf Winge
Mammal families